Antioch is an unincorporated community in Harrison County, Kentucky, in the United States.

History
Antioch once contained a sawmill and a gristmill. A post office called Antioch Mills operated from 1872 until 1904.

References

Unincorporated communities in Harrison County, Kentucky
Unincorporated communities in Kentucky